Blaq Diamond (stylized BlaQ Diamond) is a South African Afro pop duo from Ladysmith KwaZulu-Natal. 
They met in 2010 on a school trip where both participated in a music cypher in the school bus. They signed to record label Ambitiouz Entertainment, releasing their debut album Inqola (2017), which became their first iTunes number one.

The band first  gained  prominence  for their single "Ibhanoyi" released 2019, which received "SAMA Record of the year" .

Their second  studio album  Umuthi (2020), spawned  two platinum selling singles "Ibhanoyi" and "Love Letter".

History

2010-2017
In 2010, they met while on a school trip where they participated in a rap cypher in the school bus and began spending more time together, participating in school functions which earned them recognition in the community and local surroundings. The two decided to move to Johannesburg for better musical prospects which proved difficult at first as, not knowing anyone, forced them to get jobs to earn an income which was used to sustain their musical ambitions.

2017-2019:Inqola
In early  2017, the duo signed a record deal with Ambitiouz Entertainment and began to work on the debut album. In June 19, their album's  lead  single "Sthandwa" was released followed by second single "Emzini kaBaba" which was accompanied by music video.  In the winter of 2017, they released their debut album Inqola to critical acclaim. The album is a fusion of Afro-soul with Maskandi and umBhaqanga fusion which they made sound modern and youthful. At the 24th South African Music Awards, they received two SAMA Awards nominations. In 2018, they performed for the first time in Piertermaritzburg invited by a local event group to perform in a fashion show

2019-2020: Umuthi
On May 2, 2019, their  single  "Memeza" featuring Sjava was released, as album's  lead single. The song  peaked  number 9 on Radio Airplay Charts. In August 2, their second single "Ibhanoyi" was released. The song   peaked number one iTunes charts.
At the 26th ceremony of South African Music Awards, "Ibhanoyi" won Record of the Year.

On January 23, 2020, their  third single "Love Letter" was released. The song peaked number 3 on iTunes charts and number 11 on Radio Airplay Charts.

On 31 January 2020, their second studio  album Umuthi was released. The album  features  Sjava, Ci Ci, Thee legacy and Igcokama Elisha.  The album produced  three  singles "Memeza", "Love Letter" and "Ibhanoyi. The album  debuted at number 1 on iTunes Albums Charts.

On June 2020, they established Umuthi Records joint-venture  with Ambitiouz Entertainment. In mid of 2020, the duo made collaboration on  "Price to pay" and "Uhulumeni" by DJ Miss Pru. In November 20, their single "Summer YoMuthi"  was released  and debuted number one on Channel 0  Top 30 music chart.

2021-present: new projects 
In June 4, they released a single "Messiah" featuring Dumi Mkokstad. The song garnned 3 million views on YouTube.

At the 6th ceremony of  All Africa Music Awards  their song "Summer YoMuthi" received eight nominations  includes; Best Male Artiste in Southern Africa, Artiste of the Year in Africa; Song of the Year in Africa; Producer of the Year in Africa; Best Male Artiste in African Inspirational Music; Breakout Artiste of the Year; Best Artiste, Duo or Group in African Pop; Best African Duo, Group or Band. In October 29, their single "Italy" was released.

In December 2021,the duo left Ambitiouz Entertainment. 

In early September 2022, they announced a single "Qoma" featuring South African singers Big Zulu and Siya Ntuli on Instagram.

Group members ( Blaq Diamond )

Current members  
 Ndumiso Mdletshe ( Ndu Browns) - (2010–present)
 Siphelele Dunywa ( Danya Devs)- (2010–present)

Discography
 Inqola (2017)
 Umuthi (2020)

Awards and nominations

References

South African musical duos
People from KwaZulu-Natal
South African hip hop musicians
Musical groups established in 2010
Year of birth missing (living people)
2010 establishments in South Africa